The Bayer designation Omicron Centauri (ο Cen / ο Centauri) is shared by two star systems, in the constellation Centaurus:
 ο Centauri
 ο Centauri
They are separated by 0.07° on the sky.  They may be physically related.

Centauri, Omicron
Centaurus (constellation)